Charlotte Bankes (born 10 June 1995) is a British-born snowboarder who represented France in international competition before the start of the 2018–2019 season and Great Britain from that point onwards. She competed at the 2022 Winter Olympics, in Women's snowboard cross.

Career 
Bankes and her family moved from Hemel Hempstead to Puy-Saint-Vincent in the southern Alps in 1999. She had already started skiing by this time, having first tried it at age two, but took up snowboarding in the footsteps of her brothers William and Thomas, who have competed in the sport internationally. She started competing internationally for France in 2010. The following year she sustained a pelvis fracture in a crash, which left her in "constant pain" and unable to train at full intensity for several years.

She made her debut on the FIS Snowboard World Cup a few months before representing France at the 2014 Winter Olympics in Sochi, Russia. She also competed at the 2018 Winter Olympics in Pyeongchang, where she finished 7th. After the 2018 Games, she switched from representing France to competing for Great Britain, partly due to struggling to fully recover from her pelvic injury, despite the French Ski Federation paying for surgery and therapy. She took her first World Cup podium finish for Team GB in a race in Breuil-Cervinia in December 2018, where she pipped her former French team-mate Nelly Moenne-Loccoz to third place.

She participated at the FIS Freestyle Ski and Snowboarding World Championships 2019, winning a silver medal in the snowboard cross competition. Two years later, she went one better at the FIS Freestyle Ski and Snowboarding World Championships 2021, when she won the snowboard cross competition.

References

External links

1995 births
Snowboarders at the 2014 Winter Olympics
Snowboarders at the 2018 Winter Olympics
Snowboarders at the 2022 Winter Olympics
Living people
Olympic snowboarders of France
Olympic snowboarders of Great Britain
French female snowboarders
British female snowboarders
Sportspeople from Hemel Hempstead
Sportspeople from Hautes-Alpes